William J. Bolger (August 21, 1931 – October 8, 2009) was an American basketball player.

He played collegiately for Georgetown University.

He played for the Baltimore Bullets (1953–54) in the NBA for 20 games.

External links

1931 births
2009 deaths
Basketball players from New York City
American men's basketball players
Baltimore Bullets (1944–1954) players
Georgetown Hoyas men's basketball players
Milwaukee Hawks draft picks
Small forwards